Lago di Giacopiane is an artificial lake at Borzonasca in the Province of Genova, Liguria, Italy.

References 

Lakes of Liguria